Edward Francis Jennings (April 9, 1898 – February 9, 1975) was an American rowing coxswain who competed in the 1924 Summer Olympics and in the 1932 Summer Olympics. He was born in Pennsylvania and died in San Diego, California. In 1924 he was the cox of the American boat, which won the bronze medal in the coxed pairs. Eight years later he won the gold medal as cox of the American boat in the same event.

References

External links
 profile

1898 births
1975 deaths
Coxswains (rowing)
Olympic bronze medalists for the United States in rowing
Olympic gold medalists for the United States in rowing
Rowers at the 1924 Summer Olympics
Rowers at the 1932 Summer Olympics
American male rowers
Medalists at the 1932 Summer Olympics
Medalists at the 1924 Summer Olympics